Novy Urengoy Airport  is an airport in Yamalo-Nenets Autonomous Okrug, Russia located 4 km southwest of Novy Urengoy. It handles medium-sized aircraft.

History

New terminal construction 
On 25 July 2017, the contest was held, to confirm the firm, that will handle the airport reconstruction works, therefore on 7 September 2018, the airport started to be operated by Airports of Regions and began to construct the new terminal, parking space, apron and runway refurbishment. Initially, construction was planned to finish by end of 2021, but due to issues faced from COVID-19 pandemic, construction will finish by December 2022.

Airlines and destinations

Statistics

Annual traffic

References

External links 
 http://nux.aero/

Airports built in the Soviet Union
Airports in Yamalo-Nenets Autonomous Okrug